Maianthemum canadense (Canadian may-lily, Canada mayflower, false lily-of-the-valley, Canadian lily-of-the-valley, wild lily-of-the-valley, two-leaved Solomon's seal)
is an understory perennial flowering plant, native to Canada and the north-eastern United States, from Yukon and British Columbia east to Newfoundland, into St. Pierre and Miquelon. It can be found growing in both coniferous and deciduous forests. The plant appears in two forms, either as a single leaf rising from the ground with no fruiting structures or as a flowering/fruiting stem with 2-3 leaves. Flowering shoots have clusters of 12–25 starry-shaped, white flowers held above the leaves.

Description
Plants may be one-leaved and without fruiting structures (sterile). Fertile, flowering shoots have 2–3 leaves.

Leaves
Lowest leaves are usually egg-shaped with two lobes at the base and a narrow space (sinus) between the lobes. Upper leaves are usually heart-shaped and set on a short 1–7 mm long petiole.

Flowering clusters
Clusters of 12–25 starry-shaped, white flowers are set in a complex raceme - an unbranched flowering cluster that has 1-3 (usually 2) stalked flowers per node, set at roughly equal distances along a central axis. Lowest flowers open first. Flowers stalks (pedicels) are 3–7 mm long and thin (0.2-0.5 mm wide).

Flowers and fruits
The flowers are produced from spring to mid summer. They have 4 conspicuous, white, 1.5–2 mm long tepals. The fruit is a berry containing 1–2 round seeds. The berries are 4–6 mm across, mottled red in early summer and turning deep red by mid summer. Seed is produced infrequently and most plants in a location are vegetative clones, the plants spreading by their shallow, trailing, white rhizomes.

Distribution
Found in Canada from SE Yukon, southern Northwest Territories, into eastern B.C. and east to Newfoundland and Labrador, and into St. Pierre and Miquelon. Also found in northern United States from the Dakotas east, south along the Appalachian Mountains and outliers in Colorado, Wyoming Nebraska and Kansas.

Habitat and ecology
Primarily a boreal forest understory species, but also found at low elevation sites in the Rocky Mountains, to 1800 m. It is associated with moist woods but is also found in sandy pine woods in the north and can persist in clearings.

Similar species
Although most Maianthemum have flower parts in sets of 3, M. canadense plants have flowers with four tepals and four stamens, as in the very closely related Maianthemum bifolium and Maianthemum dilatatum. The range of these species do not overlap. Maianthemum bifolium is found in temperate Eurasia and Maianthemum dilatatum is essentially a coastal species found from Alaska south to NW California as well as Mongolia to Japan. Maianthemum trifolium is also a small herb and has a distribution similar to M. canadense, but the flower parts are in sets of 3s, the leaf bases are tapered, not heart-shaped and M. trifolium is found in wet habitat such as bogs.

Subspecies
No subspecies are currently recognized, although in the western half of the range plants with hairs and consistently larger leaves have been treated as var. interius.

Gallery

References

Bibliography

External links

canadense
Flora of Subarctic America
Flora of Canada
Flora of the Northwestern United States
Flora of the North-Central United States
Flora of the Northeastern United States
Flora of the Southeastern United States
Plants described in 1807
Taxa named by René Louiche Desfontaines
Flora without expected TNC conservation status